Patrick Hill may refer to:

 Patrick Joseph Hill, one of the Birmingham Six, six men sentenced to life imprisonment in 1975 in England for the Birmingham pub bombings
 Patrick Hill (artist) (born 1972), artist based in Los Angeles
 Patrick Seager Hill (1915–2010), British clothing manufacturer
 Pat Hill (born 1951), American football coach

See also
Pat Hills